Dolichi is a village and a community of the Elassona municipality. Before the 2011 local government reform it was part of the municipality of Livadi, of which it was a municipal district. The 2011 census recorded 430 inhabitants in the village. The community of Dolichi covers an area of 17.373 km2. Within the village's area is the site of the ancient city of Doliche.

Doliche is situated on the west foot of Mount Olympus, 21 km from Elassona to Katerini, at an attitude of 5,90 m. According to the last census in 2001, the population of Doliche was 473 people. 
With the municipal district of Livadi they constitute the municipality of Livadi of the prefecture Larissa. However, 2011 will comprise the municipality Elassona. Its inhabitants are mainly occupied with farming and agriculture (tobacco, grain, sugar beets, corn, clover etc.)

Attractions in the modern village include: 
The Church of the Holy Transfiguration of Christ, located in the central square and a Byzantine monument, probably of the 13th AD century.
The hill of Prophet Elias in antiquity was probably the ancient castle of Doliche Perrhaebiki Tripolis.
The Folk Museum has been operating since 2007.
The site at "fort", which according to the researchers placed the Kastri paliochristianiki Doliche. The castle is "station" on cultural and tourist development Doliche and the wider region.

See also
 List of settlements in the Larissa regional unit

References

Populated places in Larissa (regional unit)